Lebohang Lesako (born 3 July 1999) is a South African soccer player who plays as a midfielder for South African Premier Division side Kaizer Chiefs.

Club career
He made his debut for Kaizer Chiefs on 24 October 2020 in a 3–0 home defeat to Mamelodi Sundowns in the South African Premier Division.

References

Living people
1999 births
South African soccer players
People from Vanderbijlpark
Sportspeople from Gauteng
Association football midfielders
Kaizer Chiefs F.C. players
South African Premier Division players